RCSD may refer to:
Redwood City School District
Regina Catholic School Division
Rochester City School District